Lists of villages in Nigeria organised by state:

 List of villages in the Federal Capital Territory, Nigeria
 List of villages in Abia State
 List of villages in Adamawa State
 List of villages in Akwa Ibom State
 List of villages in Anambra State
 List of villages in Bauchi State
 List of villages in Bayelsa State
 List of villages in Benue State
 List of villages in Borno State
 List of villages in Cross River State
 List of villages in Delta State
 List of villages in Ebonyi State
 List of villages in Edo State
 List of villages in Ekiti State
 List of villages in Enugu State
 List of villages in Gombe State
 List of villages in Imo State
 List of villages in Jigawa State
 List of villages in Kaduna State
 List of villages in Kano State
 List of villages in Katsina State
 List of villages in Kebbi State
 List of villages in Kogi State
 List of villages in Kwara State
 List of villages in Lagos State
 List of villages in Nasarawa State
 List of villages in Niger State
 List of villages in Ogun State
 List of villages in Ondo State
 List of villages in Osun State
 List of villages in Oyo State
 List of villages in Plateau State
 List of villages in Rivers State
 List of villages in Sokoto State
 List of villages in Taraba State
 List of villages in Yobe State
 List of villages in Zamfara State

Sources: Nigerian Postal Service (NIPOST) and Independent National Electoral Commission (INEC)

References

External links
Delimitation of electoral boundaries in Nigeria: issues and challenges, by Frank Ozoh
Nigeria wards shapefiles
Maps of boundaries and wards in Nigeria by Umar Yusuf
Map of Nigeria States' Senatorial Districts (Each Nigerian state has 3 senatorial districts.)
Maps of Various States and their Local Governments with electoral wards in Nigeria